Water Street is a 2008 album by Canadian hip hop group Sweatshop Union.

Track listing
 "Now"-2:50
 "Goldrush"-3:28
 "Oh My"-3:52
 "Time Machine" (feat. Mat the Alien)-3:36
 "So Tired"-3:45
 "Blah Blah Blah"-0:58
 "Comes & Goes"-4:28
 "Jeers"-2:50
 "Pot of Stew"-2:39
 "Mashed Potatoes" (feat. Evil)-2:19
 "High Grade"-3:33
 "Cities of Gods"-2:48
 "Shoot Low" (feat. Moka Only)-3:54
 "Itchy Back"-1:42
 "Gutter Ball"-1:11
 "It's Alright"-3:44
 "Never Go Home"-1:14
 "Sunnyside Motel"-3:00
 "Timelines"-3:10
 "Moose"-3:36
 "Said and Done"-3:30
 "So Many People"-3:59
 "Dig a Grave"-7:37

Personnel 
Credits for Water Street adapted from liner notes.

 Conscience - Writer, Production, 
 Metty The Dert Merchant - Writer, Production
 Mos Eisley - Writer, Production
 Dusty - Writer, Production
 Marmalade - Writer, Production
 Kyprios - Writing
 Moka Only - Writer, Featured Artist
 Evil Ebeneezer - Writer, Featured Artist
 Mat The Alien - Featured Artist, Scratching
 Preme Diesel - Writer, Production, Programming
 Dave Knill - Writer, Production, Programming
 Jamie Kuse - Mixing, Engineer, Production
 Rob The Viking - Production, Engineering
 The Stylust - Engineering, Production
 DJ Itchy Ron - Writing, Scratching
 Kevin Coles - Guitar, Bass, Background Vocals
 Warren Flandez - Background Vocals
 Paul Gibbons - Guitar
 Chris Gestrin - Piano

2008 albums
Sweatshop Union albums